The Meneely Bell Foundry was a bell foundry established in 1826 in West Troy (now Watervliet), New York, by Andrew Meneely. Two of Andrew's sons continued to operate the foundry after his death, while a third son, Clinton H. Meneely, opened a second foundry across the river with George H. Kimberly in Troy, New York in 1870. Initially named the Meneely Bell Company of Troy, this second foundry was reorganized in 1880 as the Clinton H. Meneely Company, then again as the Meneely Bell Company. Together, the two foundries produced about 65,000 bells before they closed in 1952.

Bell locations

Below is a sample of locations where Meneely Bell Foundry bells can be seen and heard:
St. Paul Lutheran Church, Pontiac, Illinois...purchased in the late 1860's.  
St. Matthew's German Evangelical Lutheran Church Set of 10 bells cast in West Troy in 1901. Three bells added in 1966. All bells refurbished in 2008 by Christop Paccard Bellfoundries, Johns Island, SC.
 Saint Michael's Church (Rochester, New York) has two bells, cast in 1847, the larger bell weighing 1,015 pounds, the small bell weighing 525 pounds.
 Thompson Hall, University of New Hampshire - Durham, New Hampshire
 Columbia High School (New Jersey) - large bell chimes the hour
 Bulkley Memorial Carillon in Danbury, Connecticut
 St. Mary Catholic Church, Bethel, Connecticut (this bell was in the original church, located on Greenwood Ave. in Bethel but was taken out of the steeple and placed on display behind the "new" church on Dodgingtown Road)
 Central United Methodist Church in Endicott, New York
 Immanuel Lutheran Church in Madison, Nebraska
 First Presbyterian Church of Avon, New York.  Church built in 1812, 33", 700 pound Meneely Bell dated 1848.
 Jamesville Community Museum, former Episcopal church built in 1878 in Jamesville, New York
 Joseph Dill Baker Memorial Carillon in Baker Park, in Frederick, Maryland
 King Avenue United Methodist Church in Columbus, Ohio
 Lovely Lane Chapel at Epworth By The Sea on St. Simons Island, Georgia.  Chapel built in 1880 and the bell was cast in 1881.
 Faith Chapel on Jekyll Island, Georgia. Chapel built in 1904 and the bell was cast in 1901.
 Lupton Hall Carillon at Oglethorpe University in Atlanta, Georgia
 Mt. Zion Baptist Church, formerly Deutsche Congregationale Zion Kirche (German Congregational Zion Church) in Portland, Oregon
 Newton Presbyterian Church in Newton, New Jersey
 Reformed Dutch Church of Claverack, NY
 Rock Island Arsenal Clock Tower in Rock Island, Illinois has a 3,538 lb bell stamped “1867 Meneelys’ West Troy, N.Y.” 
 Saint Andrew's Catholic Church in Norwood, New York has a 3,100 lb bell of ingot copper and East India tin in a  tower.
 Saint Anthony's Church in Albany, New York
 Saint Anthony's Church (Svateho Antonina) in Strossmayerovo Namesti, Prague, Czech Republic (see below)
 Saint Peter Cathedral in Erie, Pennsylvania
 St. Peter the Apostle Roman Catholic Church in New Brunswick, New Jersey
 Saint Peter's Catholic Church, Rutland Vermont
 San Jose State University in San Jose, California "Cast to commemorate the California State Normal School in 1881, this 3,000-pound bell was rung at 8 a.m each morning until the earthquake that stilled its voice in 1903. In 1910, the bell was re-installed in the main building of the newly constructed Tower Hall, where it was rung on special occasions. In the early 1960s, seismic concerns led to its retirement and relocation at ground level." -Source credit: plaque on San Jose State campus. Wikipedia link to photo: http://en.wikipedia.org/wiki/File:California_Normal_School_Bell.JPG
 Wesley Knox United Church. Woodville, Nova Scotia. Canada.
 Saint Stephen's Episcopal Church, Sherman, Texas
Trinity Church, Newport, Rhode Island
 University of Northern Iowa in Cedar Falls, Iowa dedicated in 1926 
 Washington Memorial Chapel has a carillon in the National Patriots Bell Tower at Valley Forge National Historical Park
 Wofford College in Spartanburg, South Carolina
 Eastern State Hospital Medical Library, Building No. 3, Williamsburg, Virginia is the location of a Meneely Bell carrying the manufacturer's date of 1886.  It was originally utilized to signify curfews and special events at the nation's oldest psychiatric hospital, established in 1773.  You may visit the Eastern State Hospital website at www.esh.dbhds.virginia.gov
 Mattawamkeag Church of God in Mattawamkeag, Maine (Dated 1900)www.mattawamkeagcog.com
 Carlisle Presbyterian Church, Carlisle, New York
 Roddick Gate McGill University in Montreal
 Church of the Nativity, Menlo Park, California
 Cathedral Church of St. Mark, Salt Lake City, Utah 
 St Lawrence Hall, Toronto, Ontario. (This bell, cast in 1849, is unused and virtually inaccessible in the cupola of St Lawrence Hall.
 Laingsburg United Methodist Church, Laingsburg MI (1881 bell) www.laingsburgumc.org
 Lacon Congregational Church, Lacon, IL (bell cast in 1890)
 Wilder Center, Wilder, Vermont www.wildercenter.com
 Saugerties Lighthouse, Saugerties, NY (photo) www.saugertieslighthouse.com
 Church of the Ascension, Rockville Centre, NY. (1873 bell) Cast for Christ Church, Poughkeepsie, NY. Sold back to Meneely bell foundry and resold in 1888 to Church of the Ascension.

Below is a sample of locations where bells from the second Meneely bell foundry can be seen and heard:
 Church of the Sacred Heart, Waseca, MN (Maneely & Kimberly, Founders, Troy, NY 1872)
 Davis County Courthouse (Maneely & Kimberly Bell Co., 1879) in Bloomfield, Iowa
 The Phelps School's "Victory Bell" in Malvern, Pennsylvania
 A Meneely & Kimberly bell remains in front of the Cortland Elementary School in Cortland, Ohio. The school was once named Cortland Union School as cast on the bell 1876. This bell will soon be relocated to the Cortland High School.
 The Morehead-Patterson Bell Tower, Chapel Hill, NC.  The twelve original bells were cast by the Meneely Bell Company   in the early 1930s, and supplemented by two bells from Petit & Fritsen, Belgium in 1998.
 Sainte-Marthe-De-Vaudreuil Catholic Church, Quebec, Canada.
 St. Andrew's United Church in Markham, Ontario
 Bell in the name of Miss Elsie Priest, Tunghai University, Taichung, Taiwan.
 A Meneely & Kimberly bell is in daily service in the Parish Church of San Andres Xecul, Totonicapan, Guatemala.
 Most Holy Trinity Church in Brooklyn, New York.
 Soldiers Chapel - Schofield Barracks; Wahiawa,Oahu, Hawaii. Church steeple built 1913. Bell dated 1911.
 Assumption Church - Staten Island, NY. Assumption - St. Paul Parish. Bells dedicated August 6, 1922.
 St. Patrick's Catholic Church, Ogden, Kansas.  Bell dated 1910

Columbian Liberty Bell
The Columbian Liberty Bell was cast by Clinton H. Meneely's foundry for display at the World's Columbian Exposition in Chicago in 1893. The bell disappeared while on tour in Europe.

Saint Anthony’s Church Bell, Prague, Czech Republic

The Meneely bell that hangs in St Anthony's Church in Prague was purchased by the Mid-European Union in October 1918 to commemorate the independence of Czechoslovakia after World War I and donated to the group's president, Thomas Masaryk, who became the head of the country's provisional government and, in 1920, the Czechoslovak president. The bell cost $2,000 and weighed 2,542 pounds (1,155 kg).

See also
 Benjamin Hanks (1755-1824), goldsmith and instrument maker
 Campanology: Carillons (a concise chapter in the general article Campanology)
 Bell tower

References

External links
 Meneely Bell Online Museum
 The Meneely Foundry in West Troy, Troy United Newsletter, December 1999

Bell foundries of the United States
1826 establishments in the United States
1852 disestablishments